Chambers was a BBC radio and television sitcom. It was written by barrister Clive Coleman and starred John Bird and Sarah Lancashire in both versions. The radio version was broadcast on BBC Radio 4 in three series between 1996 and 1999, and the television version was broadcast on BBC One. The theme music was "Dance with Mandolins" from Prokofiev's Romeo and Juliet.

John Bird plays the lead role of John Fuller-Carp, a monstrously egotistical and avaricious barrister heading Forecourt Chambers. His colleagues are Hilary Tripping, a rather ineffectual young man, and Ruth Quirke, initially a rather militantly left wing feminist. After Lesley Sharp left the role after the first series and Sarah Lancashire took over, Ruth became more of comic neurotic, but many of the 'original' Ruth's harder characteristics were later given to the character who replaced her in the second run of the television series, Alex Kahn.

Radio cast
John Bird as John Fuller-Carp
James Fleet as Hilary Tripping
Lesley Sharp as Ruth Quirke (Series 1)
Sarah Lancashire as Ruth Quirke (Series 2 & 3)
Jonathan Kydd as Vince Griffiths, the barristers' clerk
Jeremy Clyde as Vernon Ames

Television cast
John Bird as John Fuller-Carp
Sarah Lancashire as Ruth Quirke (Series 1) (2000)
Nina Wadia as Alex Kahn (Series 2) (2001)
James Fleet as Hilary Tripping
Jonathan Kydd as Vince Griffiths
Jeremy Clyde as Vernon Ames
John Hodgkinson as Guy
John Rowe as Judge Riseby

References

External links
 Comedy Guide
British Comedy and Drama website episode guide

1996 radio programme debuts
2000 British television series debuts
2001 British television series endings
2000s British legal television series
2000s British sitcoms
BBC Radio comedy programmes
BBC television sitcoms
English-language television shows
Television articles with incorrect naming style